The Maryland Loyalists Battalion, referred to in Captain Caleb Jones's orderly book as the First Battalion of Maryland Loyalists, was a British provincial regiment of colonial American Loyalists during the American Revolutionary War.

American Revolution
As with other colonies in British America, Maryland was bitterly divided by the American Revolution. Members of the existing political elite tended to make reluctant revolutionaries; men such as Benedict Swingate Calvert, illegitimate son of the ruling Calvert family and a judge of the land office, remained loyal to the British Crown, and would suffer the consequences. Like other loyalists, Calvert would find himself on the losing side of the Revolutionary War, effectively ending his political career. The Annapolis Convention of 1774 to 1776 saw the old Maryland elite overthrown – men like Calvert, Governor Eden and George Steuart all lost their political power, and in many cases their land and wealth. After the war, Loyalists would have to pay triple taxes and were forced to sign the loyalty oath. Many had their lands and property confiscated.

Battalion history
The unit was composed primarily of colonists from the Eastern Shore of Maryland; it was commissioned in British-held Philadelphia in mid-October 1777 as "The First Battalion of Maryland Loyalists." The unit's commander, Lt. Col. James Chalmers of Newtown, Maryland (present-day Chestertown), was an active Loyalist writer.  

The Maryland Loyalists saw limited action in 1778 at the Battle of Monmouth before being shipped off to Pensacola, West Florida, to fight the Spanish in the fall. A number of soldiers of the battalion died of smallpox upon arrival. Weakened by the epidemic and limited manpower, the Maryland Loyalists garrison was subsequently defeated by the Spanish in the siege of Pensacola in 1781. After a brief time as Spanish prisoners of war in Cuba, the battalion was eventually sent back to New York City, the command center for British forces during the war.

After the war, the soldiers of the battalion, along with many other American loyalists, were transported by the British government as refugees to Nova Scotia. In the fall of 1783, a ship carrying the exiled battalion was shipwrecked off the Nova Scotia coast. The survivors made up the first British American citizens of the new Canadian province of New Brunswick.

The Maryland Loyalist Battalion is also a Revolutionary War reenacting unit based in Baltimore, Maryland.

Notable soldiers 
William Augustus Bowles was an ensign in the Maryland Loyalists Battalion. In the 1790s, he became a leader of the Creek Indians.

Philip Barton Key was a captain in the Maryland Loyalists Battalion.  After the war, Key studied law in England and returned to Maryland in 1785. He was admitted to the bar and entered private practice in Leonardtown, Maryland from 1787 to 1790. He practiced in Annapolis, Maryland from 1790 to 1794, and from 1799 to 1800. Key was a member of the Maryland House of Delegates from 1794 to 1799 and Mayor of Annapolis from 1797 to 1798.

See also
Loyalist (American Revolution)
History of Maryland in the American Revolution
Spain in the American Revolutionary War

Reference/Suggested reading 
 Andrews, Matthew Page, History of Maryland, Doubleday Doran & Co, New York, (1929)
 Yentsch, Anne E, p.55, A Chesapeake Family and their Slaves: a Study in Historical Archaeology, Cambridge University Press (1994) Retrieved Jan 28, 2010
Maryland Loyalists in the American Revolution by M. Christopher New. Tidewater Publishers; Centreville, MD, 1996.

Notes

Military units and formations established in 1777
Loyalist military units in the American Revolution
Maryland in the American Revolution
1777 establishments in Maryland
1783 disestablishments in Maryland